Odessa is an unincorporated community in Klamath County, Oregon, United States. Odessa lies along the western shore of Upper Klamath Lake near the Fremont–Winema National Forest.

A post office operated in Odessa from 1902 thru 1919. Blanche Griffith was one of the early postmasters. According to Oregon Geographic Names (OGN), in the late 1940s Griffith said that the wife of her husband's brother named the community after a place in France. However, the OGN compiler thought it more likely that the name related to the city of Odessa in Ukraine.

The community was founded in the 1890s as a resort hotel and Indian trading post. Odessa Campground in the national forest is near Odessa.

References

External links
 Klamath County Birding Trails

Unincorporated communities in Klamath County, Oregon
1902 establishments in Oregon
Populated places established in 1902
Unincorporated communities in Oregon